Cranberry Lake 50 is a recreational trail around Cranberry Lake in northeastern New York state, U.S.  The trail is  long.

The Cranberry Lake 50 trail was proposed in 1994 and completed by 2008.

See also 
 Long-distance trails in the United States

References 

Hiking trails in New York (state)
Long-distance trails in the United States